{{DISPLAYTITLE:C17H15NO3}}
The molecular formula C17H15NO3 (molar mass: 281.31 g/mol, exact mass: 281.1052 u) may refer to:

 Acetoxyacetylaminofluorene
 Indoprofen
 Noroliveroline

Molecular formulas